Moori may refer to:

Moori, Estonia, village in Saarepeedi Parish, Viljandi County, Estonia
Moori Tips, Japanese manufacturer of pool and billiard cue tips
Hideo Moori, the company's founder

See also
Mori, Japanese and Italian surname
Māori, indigenous people of New Zealand